Aztec is a 1980 historical fiction novel by American author Gary Jennings. It is the first of two novels Jennings wrote in the Aztec series, followed by Aztec Autumn. The remaining four novels (Aztec Blood, 2002; Aztec Rage, 2006; Aztec Fire, 2008; Aztec Revenge, 2012) were written by other authors after Jennings died in 1999.

Summary
The book is written as a series of letters from the Bishop of the See of New Spain to King Carlos of Spain, containing a transcribed biography of Mixtli (full name Chicóme-Xochitl Tliléctic Mixtli, "Seven Flower Dark Cloud", in Nahuatl), an elderly Aztec man, by Spanish Catholic monks during the 16th century.

The novel portrays the entirety of the life of Mixtli-Dark Cloud, who is asked by Bishop Juan de Zumárraga to tell about his life, since King Carlos I of Spain (Charles V, Holy Roman Emperor) wants a chronicle of what Aztecs were like. Born to ordinary parents and afflicted with keratoconus, Mixtli nonetheless rises quickly through the hierarchy of Mexican society, becoming a scribe, a wealthy trader, a renowned warrior, and eventually a lord of Tenochtitlan and a highly respected councilor to Moctezuma II. The novel chronicles Mixtli's many adventures, which take him through all of the Aztec Empire ("The One World") and beyond. The 'composer' of the novel, Bishop Zumárraga, is often commented upon by the narrator, who notes when the Bishop arrives to hear generally lurid details of human sacrifice and sexual impropriety, and often leaves just as quickly in disgust. The Bishop's introductions to the various chapters of the chronicle often express his loathing for Mixtli and his weariness with recording what he considers to be the biography of a heathen and a sinner.

Historical accuracy
The novel faithfully recreates a great deal of historical geographic places and history, particularly that involving the Spanish conquest of the Aztec empire in an expedition led by Hernán Cortés. Jennings, through Dark Cloud, presents generally accurate portrayals of the events surrounding a number of actual historical figures, their names usually rendered in traditional Nahuatl. This includes descriptions of many rulers ("Revered Speakers") of many civilizations, such as Ahuizotl and Moctezuma II of the Mexíca, Nezahualpili of the Acolhua or Patzínca of the Totonac, La Malinche (rendered Cé-Malinali, "One Grass" in Nahuatl, and later self-proclaimed "Lady Grass", Malintzin), the shipwrecked Gerónimo de Aguilar and Gonzalo Guerrero, as well as Hernán Cortés himself and many of his retinue.

The novel's narrator maintains a voice of careful criticism of Spanish authorities throughout the novel. Though he professes himself a Christian, much of the novel is devoted to detailed discourse regarding Aztec religion, including a great deal of information regarding the gods Quetzalcoatl, Tlaloc, Huitzilopochtli, Tonatiuh, and especially Ehecatl. The novel also does not shy from depictions of ritual human sacrifice. Throughout the novel, Mixtli criticizes not only Christianity, but also the Spaniards' hypocrisy in espousing Christianity while simultaneously engaging in acts of great violence and degradation toward the native populations.

External links
Official website

1980 American novels
American historical novels
Aztecs in fiction
Novels set during the Conquest of the Americas
Novels set in Mexico
Epistolary novels
Novels set in the 16th century
Cultural depictions of Hernán Cortés
Fiction with unreliable narrators
Atheneum Books books